Bert is a Swedish television series with 12 episodes, based on the Bert Diaries by Anders Jacobsson and Sören Olsson, and originally airing over SVT each Saturday evening during the period of 1 October-17 December 1994. It was directed by Tomas Alfredson and Svante Kettner. The theme song was performed by Lill-Babs, and called "Älskade ängel". Another song regaining revival with the TV series was Sven-Olof Sandberg's 1938 success "Är det så här när man är kär".

The plot is based on the Bert Diaries, but just like in the comics, the story opens in the 6th grade, not the 5th like in the books.

Episodes
Närkontakt i sjätte klassen
Den ohyggligt fule
Erik the Great
Det viktiga är inte att kämpa väl utan att vinna
Min älskling du är som en tulipan
Fega pojkar får ibland kyssa vackra flickor
Sjön suger
Hjärnsläpp
Fina, fina Paulina
Klimpen, min allra bästa vän
Sådan far, sådan son
Ett långt och lyckligt liv

Home video
The series was released to VHS in 1995 on six VHS tapes by Sandrew film consisting of two episodes on each tape, and by Sandrew in 1999 to DVD with three discs each one consisting of four episodes, and in 2011 the entire series was released on one single DVD disc.

The home video release saw much of the music being replaced because of high costs for the rights to many of the songs.

Video releases

VHS

DVD

About the series
The square often seen in the series is in real life Central Årsta in Southern Stockholm, while the apartment buildings were shot in Hagalund. When the Heman Hunters perform, Martin Andersson (portraying Bert) sings in-universe, while the recorded voice is from Oliver Loftéen (portraying Åke) . A minor role was played by Sarah Dawn Finer.

Lill-Erik was originally intended to domesticate an elk in the episode "Fina, fina Paulina" , but when domesticated elk was around, he instead domesticate an elephant on the run from a circus.

References

External links

The show at SVT's open archive

1994 Swedish television series debuts
1994 Swedish television series endings
Swedish children's television series
Television shows based on children's books
Television shows set in Sweden
1990s Swedish television series
Television shows filmed in Sweden
Television series about teenagers